Dash Bolagh-e Barzand (also Romanized as Dāsh Bolāgh-e Barzand; also known as Dāsh Bolāgh) is a village in Pain Barzand Rural District, Anguti District, Germi County, Ardabil Province, Iran. At the 2006 census, its population was 18, in 4 families.

References 

Towns and villages in Germi County